Haynie is a surname. Notable people with the surname include:

 Kristin Haynie (born 1983) American basketball player in the WNBA
 Sandra Haynie (born 1943) American professional golfer
 Aubrey Haynie (born 1974) American bluegrass musician
 Dave Haynie (born 1961) former Commodore International chief engineer 
 Hugh Haynie (1927–1999) American political cartoonist
 Isham N. Haynie (1824-1868) Union Army officer during the American Civil War
 Charles Haynie (1935–2001) faculty member at SUNY in Buffalo, New York, U.S.